The I-694 Bridge is a pair of girder bridges that spans the Mississippi River between the cities of Brooklyn Center and Fridley in Minnesota. The westbound bridge was built in 1963 by the Minnesota Department of Transportation, and widened in 1987 with a new structure above the piers.  The eastbound bridge was built in 1988, also by the Minnesota Department of Transportation.

The former eastbound bridge was authorized in April 1942 at the beginning of World War II as a wartime construction link of Minnesota State Highway 100 to New Brighton, Minnesota.  When Interstate 694 was built, the Highway 100 bridge was widened and used for the eastbound lanes, while a new bridge was built for the westbound lanes.  The eastbound bridge, showing its age, was demolished in 1988 and a new bridge was built.

This bridge is Minnesota's second-busiest, carrying 150,000 cars per day. There is a sidewalk on the north side of the bridge allowing pedestrians and bicyclists to cross.

See also
List of crossings of the Upper Mississippi River

References

 

Bridges completed in 1963
Bridges completed in 1988
Road bridges in Minnesota
Bridges over the Mississippi River
Bridges on the Interstate Highway System
Interstate 94
Great River Road
Girder bridges in the United States
Bridges in Hennepin County, Minnesota
Transportation buildings and structures in Anoka County, Minnesota